Liolaemus tregenzai is a species of lizard in the family Iguanidae. It is from Argentina.

References

tregenzai
Lizards of South America
Reptiles of Argentina
Endemic fauna of Argentina
Reptiles described in 2007